Veron Parkes (born 28 September 2001) is an English professional footballer who plays as a forward.

Career
Parkes joined West Ham United from Crystal Palace in January 2018. In August 2020, Parkes joined Eredivisie side Fortuna Sittard on a three-year deal. In October 2020, he joined Eerste Divisie side Dordrecht on a season-long loan deal. On 18 October 2020, Parkes made his professional league debut as a substitute in a 2–2 draw with Almere City. Parkes played twice for Southern Combination Premier Division side AFC Varndeanians after joining the club in November 2021.

Career statistics

References

2001 births
Living people
Association football forwards
Fortuna Sittard players
English footballers
FC Dordrecht players
Eerste Divisie players
Expatriate footballers in the Netherlands
English expatriate footballers
English expatriate sportspeople in the Netherlands